The yellow-billed malkoha (Rhamphococcyx calyorhynchus) is a species of cuckoo in the family Cuculidae. It is endemic to Sulawesi, Indonesia. Its natural habitat is subtropical or tropical moist lowland forests.

References

Cuculidae
Endemic birds of Sulawesi
Birds described in 1825
Taxonomy articles created by Polbot